Patag may refer to:
 Patag (sword), a traditional Bhutanese sword
 Patag, a barangay of Malapatan, Sarangani in the Philippines
 Patag, a barangay of Silay City in the Philippines
 Patag Shoal, a shoal part of Spratly Island
 Patag island in the South China Sea